The 2022 TCR South America Touring Car Championship is the second season of TCR South America Touring Car Championship.

Calendar 
The championship is to begin in January 2022, with a maximum of 40 entries, eight rounds consisting of sixteen 35-minute races would be run in Argentina, Brazil and Uruguay.

Teams and drivers

Results and standings

Season summary

Scoring system

Drivers' championship

Notes

References

External links
 

South America
TCR South America
TCR South America
TCR South America
TCR South America